Stephen Craig may refer to:

 Stephen Lyle Craig, first and current husband of Marie Osmond
 Stephen Craig (bobsleigh) (born 1967), Australian bobsledder
 Stephen L. Craig, American chemist and Professor